Anita is a feminine given name. The name and its variants are now common worldwide, especially in regions where Indo-European languages are spoken, namely Europe, South Asia, North America.

People

Given name
Anita W. Addison (1952–2004), American television and film director and producer
Anita Álvarez de Williams (born 1931), American anthropologist, photographer, and historian
Anita Østby (born 1972), Norwegian Liberal Party politician
Anita Allen (pentathlete) (born 1977), American Olympic pentathlete
Anita Alpern (1920–2006), American Internal Revenue Service official
Anita Alvarez (born 1960), American government official, State's Attorney of Cook County, Illinois
Anita Alvarez (synchronized swimmer), American, (born 1996)
Anita Among (born 1973), Ugandan accountant, lawyer and politician
Anita Anand (born 1972), British radio presenter, and journalist
Anita Anand (born 1967), Canadian lawyer and current Member of Parliament currently serving as Minister of Public Services and Procurement
Anita Andreassen, Norwegian mushing competitor
Anita Apelthun Sæle (born 1951), Norwegian politician
Anita Arya (born 1963), Indian politician
Anita Asante (born 1985), British footballer
Anita Auglend (born 1979), Norwegian singer
Anita Augspurg (1857–1943), German lawyer, actor, writer, and feminist
Anita B. Brody (born 1935), American judge
Anita Bärwirth (1918–1994), German gymnast
Anita Baker (born 1958), American R&B and soul singer and songwriter
Anita Barone (born 1964), American actress
Anita Berber (1899–1928), German dancer, actress, and writer
Anita Berrizbeitia (born 1957), Venezuelan-born American landscape theorist, teacher, and writer
Anita Best, Canadian teacher, broadcaster, and singer
Anita Bitri-Prapaniku (1968–2004), Albanian pop singer and violinist
Anita Björk (1923–2012), Swedish actress
Anita K. Blair (born 1950), American military judge
Anita Błochowiak (born 1973), Polish politician
Anita Borg (1949–2003), American computer scientist
Anita Bose Pfaff (born 1942), Austrian economics professor, daughter of Indian politician Subhas Chandra Bose
Anita Boyer (1915–1985), American Big Band singer and songwriter
Anita Brenner (1905–1974), Mexican-born writer of children's literature and books on Mexican art and history
Anita Briem (born 1982), Icelandic actress
Anita Brodén (born 1948), Swedish Liberal People's Party politician
Anita Brookner CBE (1928–2016), British novelist and art historian
Anita Bryant (born 1940), American singer
Anita Bulath (born 1983), Hungarian handballer
Anita Buri (born 1978), Swiss beauty pageant winner, crowned Miss Switzerland 1999
Anita Bush (1883–1974), American stage actress and playwright
Anita C. Hill (born 1951), American cleric
Anita Calvert Lebourgeoise (1879–1940), American attorney, judge, genealogist, biographer, and feminist
Anita Caprioli (born 1973), Italian theater and film actress
Anita Carey (born 1948), British actress
Anita Carter (1933–1999), American country and folk singer
Anita Caspary (1915–2011), American nun, founder of Immaculate Heart of Mary Community
Anita Cerquetti (1931–2014), Italian dramatic soprano
Anita Chapman (born 1952), British Paralympic archer
Anita Christensen (born 1972), Danish professional boxer
Anita Cobby (1959–1986), Australian nurse and beauty pageant winner
Anita Cifra (born 1989), Hungarian handballer
Anita Cochran (born 1967), American country singer, songwriter, and record producer
Anita Colby (1914–1992), American actress and model
Anita Coleman, American librarian and researcher
Anita Conti (1899–1997), French explorer, photographer and oceanographer
Anita Cornwell (born 1923), American gay rights advocate
Anita Daher, Canadian writer of juvenile and teen books
Anita Darian (1927–2015), American singer and actress
Anita De Bauch (born 1986), British model
Anita de Braganza (1886–1977), American socialite and heiress
Anita DeFrantz (born 1952), American Olympic rower
Anita De Sosoo
Anita Delgado (1890–1962), Spanish flamenco dancer and singer
Anita Desai (born 1937), Indian novelist and academic
Anita Diamant (born 1951), American writer
Anita Dobson (born 1949), British television actress
Anita Dolly Panek (born 1930), Brazilian biochemist
Anita Doreen Diggs (born 1966), American editor, novelist, and lecturer
Anita Doth (born 1971), Dutch singer
Anita Dunn (born 1958), American political consultant
Anita Ekberg (1931–2015), Swedish model and actress
Anita Elberse (born 1970s), American academic
Anita Ellis (born 1920), Canadian-born American singer and actress
Anita Elson (1898–1985), American dancer and singer
Anita Fernandini de Naranjo (1902–1982), Peruvian politician
Anita Finlay, American actress
Anita Görbicz (born 1983), Hungarian handball player
Anita Gaće (born 1983), Croatian handballer
Anita Gale, Baroness Gale (born 1940), British politician
Anita Galić (born 1985), Croatian freestyle swimmer
Anita Ganeri, British writer, the Horrible Geography series
Anita Gara (born 1983), Hungarian chess grand master
Anita Garanča (1949-2015), Latvian singer and music teacher, mother of the famous operatic mezzo-soprano Elīna Garanča
Anita Garibaldi (1821–1849), Brazilian-born revolutionary, wife of Giuseppe Garibaldi
Anita Garvin (1907–1994), American actress and comedian
Anita Gershman, American film producer
Anita Gillette (born 1936), American actress
Anita Glesta (born 1958), American artist
Anita Goel, American physicist and physician
Anita Gradin (born 1933), Swedish politician and ambassador
Anita Grūbe (born 1955), Latvian actress 
Anita Guha (1932–2007), Indian film actress
Anita Gutwell (born 1931), Austrian film actress
Anita Håkenstad (born 1968), Norwegian long-distance runner
Anita Hagen (1931–2015), Canadian politician
Anita Halpin (born 1944), British politician
Anita Hansbo (born 1960), Swedish mathematician and academic administrator
Anita Harding (1952–1995), British neurologist
Anita Harris (born 1942), British actress and singer
Anita Hegerland (born 1961), Norwegian singer
Anita Hegh (born 1972), Australian actor
Anita Heiss (born 1968), Indigenous Australian writer
Anita Hendrie (1863–1940), American actress
Anita Hill (born 1956), American academic
Aníta Hinriksdóttir (born 1996), Icelandic middle-distance runner
Anita Hoffman (1942–1998), American activist and writer, wife of radical Abbie Hoffman
Anita Howard (born 1969), American sprinter
Anita Huffington (born 1934), American sculptor
Anita Inder Singh, Indian international affairs analyst
Anita Iseghohi (born 1985), Nigerian businesswoman
Anita Jönsson (born 1947), Swedish Social Democratic politician
Anita Johansson (figure skater) (born 1954), Swedish figure skater
Anita Johansson (politician) (born 1944), Swedish Social Democratic politician
Anita Jose (born 1970s), Indian-born educator and business strategist
Anita Kanter (born 1933), American tennis player ranked in World top 10
Anita Kanwal (born 1954), Indian television actress and producer
Anita Kanwar, Indian film and television actor
Anita Kazai (born 1988), Hungarian handballer
Anita Kelsey, British singer and songwriter
Anita Kerr (1927–2022), American singer, composer, arranger and producer
Anita King (1884–1963), American racecar driver, actress, and thoroughbred racehorse owner
Anita Klein (born 1960), Austrialina-born British painter and print-maker
Anita Klemensen (born 1977), Danish chef
Anita Kulcsár (1976–2005), Hungarian handballer
Anita Kuhlke (born 1947), German rower
Anita Kunz (born 1956), Canadian-born artist and illustrator
Anita L. Allen (born 1953), American academic
Anita Lallande (born 1949), Puerto Rican Olympic swimmer
Anita Lane (1959–2021), Australian singer and songwriter
Anita Lasker-Wallfisch (born 1925), German-born cellist and Holocaust survivor
Anita Leocádia Prestes (born 1936), Brazilian historian
Anita Lerche (born 1973), Danish singer, songwriter, and composer
Anita Lerman (born 1944), American politician
Anita Liepiņa (born 1967), Latvian race walker and long distance runner
Anita Linda (born 1924), Filipino film actor
Anita Lipnicka (born 1975), Polish singer and songwriter
Anita Lizana (1915–1994), Chilean tennis player
Anita Lo, American chef and restaurateur
Anita Lonsbrough MBE (born 1941), British swimmer
Anita Loos (1889–1981), American screenwriter and playwright
Anita Louise (1915–1970), American film actress
Anita Louise Combe, Australian actress, singer, and dancer
Anita Louise Suazo (born 1947), Native-American potter
Anita Márton (born 1989), Hungarian shot putter
Anita Madden (born 1933), American sportswoman
Anita Malfatti (1889–1964), Brazilian artist
Anita Mann (born 1946), American choreographer, dancer, and actress
Anita Marks (born 1970), American football player and radio personality
Anita Martinez (born 1925), American politician
Anita Martini (1939–1993), American journalist
Anita Mason (born 1942), British writer
Anita McNaught (born 1965), British-born New Zealand journalist and television presenter
Anita Meyer (Annita Meijer, born 1954), Dutch singer
Anita Miller (publisher) (1926–2018), American author and publisher
Anita Miller (field hockey) (born 1951), American field hockey player and Olympic athlete
Anita Miller Smith (1893–1968), American impressionist and regionalist painter
Anita Moen (born 1967), Norwegian cross-country skier
Anita Mormand (born 1971), French sprinter
Anita Morris (1943–1994), American actress
Anita Mui (1963–2003), Hong Kong singer and actress
Anita Nüßner (born 1935), German sprint canoeist
Anita Nair (born 1966), Indian-born writer
Anita Nall (born 1976), American Olympic swimmer
Anita Neville MP (born 1942), Canadian politician
Anita Newcomb McGee (1864–1940), American physician
Anita North, British shooter
Anita Nyberg (born 1940), Swedish academic
Anita Nyman (born 1971), Finnish cross-country skier
Anita O'Day (1919–2006), American jazz singer
Anita de Braganza (1886–1977), American socialite and heiress
Anita Orlund (born 1964), Norwegian Labour Party politician
Anita Ortega, Puerto Rican basketball player
Anita Otto (born 1942), German discus thrower
Anita Pádár (born 1979), Hungarian footballer
Anita Page (1910–2008), American film actress
Anita Palermo Kelly (1913–1990), American politician
Anita Pallenberg (1942–2017), Italian-born actress, model, and fashion designer
Annita Pania (born 1970), Greek television hostess
Anita Parkhurst Willcox (1892–1984), American artist, feminist, and pacifist
Anita Peabody (1925–1934), American racehorse
Anita Perez Ferguson (born 1949), American speaker, consultant, and writer
Anita Perras (born 1960), Canadian country singer
Anita Thigpen Perry (born 1952), American healthcare advocate and First Lady of Texas (2000–2015)
Anita Phillips (born 1945), Australian politician
Anita Pistone (born 1976), Italian runner
Anita Pointer (1948–2022), American R&B/soul singer and songwriter, member of The Pointer Sisters
Anita Pollitzer (1894–1975), American photographer
Anita J. Prazmowska, British academic
Anita Protti (born 1964), Swiss track and field athlete
Anita Punt (born 1987), New Zealand field hockey player
Anita Rachlis, Canadian AIDS researcher
Anita Raj (born 1962), Indian actress
Anita Ramasastry, American academic
Anita Rani (born 1977), British radio and television presenter and journalist
Anita Rapp (born 1977), Norwegian footballer
Anita Ratnam (born 1954), Indian dancer and choreographer
Anita Rau Badami (born 1961), Indian-born Canadian writer
Anita Reeves (1948–2016), Irish actress
Anita Renfroe (born 1962), American comedian
Anita Roberts (1942–2006), American molecular biologist
Anita Roddick DBE (1942–2007), British businesswoman, founder of The Body Shop
Anita Rollin (born c. 1981), Sri. Lankan snowboarder
Anita Sarkeesian (born 1983), Canadian-American feminist
Anita Schätzle (born 1981), German freestyle wrestler
Anita Schjøll Brede (born 1985), Norwegian entrepreneur
Anita Shapira (born 1940), Israeli historian
Anita Sheoran (born 1984), Indian freestyle wrestler
Anita Shreve (1946–2018), American writer
Anita Sidén (born 1940), Swedish Moderate Party politician
Anita Silvers, American philosopher
Anita Silvey, American editor and literary critic
Anita Singhvi (born 1964), Indian classical singer
Anita Skorgan (born 1958), Norwegian singer and songwriter
Anita Smits (born 1967), Dutch archer
Anita Snellman (1924–2006), Finnish painter
Anita Sokołowska (born 1976), Polish actress
Anita Stansfield (born 1961), American writer
Anita Stewart (1895–1961), American actress and film producer
Anita Stewart (culinary author) (born 1947), Canadian culinary writer and food activist
Anita Strindberg (born 1937), Italian actress
Anita Summers, American educator
Anita Thallaug (born 1938), Norwegian actor and singer
Anita Tijoux (born 1977), French-born Chilean hip-hop musician
Anita Tsoy (born 1971), Russian singer
Anita Turner (born 1972), British script editor and television producer
Anita Ušacka (born 1952), Latvian judge and academic
Anita Utseth (born 1966), Norwegian engineer and politician
Anita Uwagbale (now Anita Iseghohi), Nigerian beauty queen and model
Anita Valen (born 1968), Norwegian cyclist
Anita Vogel (born 1969), American news reporter
Anita Weiß (born 1955), German middle-distance runner
Anita Włodarczyk (born 1985), Polish hammer thrower
Anita Waage (born 1971), Norwegian footballer
Anita Wachter (born 1967), Austrian alpine skier
Anita Wagner (born 1960), Austrian singer
Anita Wall (born 1940), Swedish actress
Anita Ward (born 1957), American singer
Anita Werner (born 1978), Polish television journalist
Anita West (born 1935), British actress and television presenter
Anita Weyermann (born 1977), Swiss middle-distance runner
Anita Wood (born 1937), American television performer
Anita Yuen (born 1971), Hong Kong actress
Anita Zucker (born 1952), American businesswoman, first female Governor of the Hudson's Bay Company
Gurmayum Anita Devi, Indian mountaineer
J. Anita Stup (born 1945), American politician
Jagat and Anita Nanjappa, Indian race-car drivers
Princess Anita of Orange-Nassau (born 1969), Dutch royal

Characters
Anita Blake, the protagonist of Laurell K. Hamilton's novel series Anita Blake: Vampire Hunter
Anita (Darkstalkers), a video game character in Night Warriors: Darkstalkers' Revenge
Anita Hailey (Shiho Miyano), a character in the manga/anime Case Closed
Anita Santos, character on the ABC daytime drama All My Children
Anita Barnes, a character from the film The Butterfly Effect 3: Revelations played by Chantel Giacalone
Anita Knight, from The Secret Show
Anita Van Buren, character on the television crime drama Law & Order portrayed by S. Epatha Merkerson
Anita, a comic book character in the works of Italian artist Guido Crepax
Anita, a character in the musical West Side Story
Anita Bircham, a character from Sleepaway Camp III: Teenage Wasteland portrayed by Sonya Maddox
Anita, a recurring character in the British sit-com dinnerladies (TV series)
Anita "Needy" Lesnicki, a character in the black comedy horror film Jennifer's Body
Anita, a girlfriend character in Need for Speed
Anita Radcliffe, character in Disney's animated film 101 Dalmatians
Anita, a character in the anime Hunter × Hunter episode 11
Anita Robb, a character in the film Friday the 13th: A New Beginning played by Jere Fields
Anita is the middle name of American Dad! character Steve Smith

See also
Amita
Anahita
Annette (disambiguation)
Anna (given name)
Annie (given name)
Anya
Annika (given name)

References

Italian feminine given names
Spanish feminine given names
Portuguese feminine given names
Hungarian feminine given names
Scandinavian feminine given names
Latvian feminine given names
Hebrew feminine given names